Locomotives of the Lancashire and Yorkshire Railway. The Lancashire and Yorkshire Railway locomotive works were originally at Miles Platting, Manchester. From 1889 they were at Horwich.

Constituent companies 
The L&YR came into being in 1847 when the Manchester and Leeds Railway changed its name.
Locomotives added to its stock before that date came from the: 
 Manchester and Bolton Railway (amalgamated 18 August 1846)
 North Union Railway (a share acquired 31 December 1846)

As the L&YR, locomotives were taken into stock from the:
 Preston & Wyre Railway, Harbour and Dock Co. (vested L&Y (two thirds) and L&NWR (one third) 28 July 1849)
 Blackburn, Darwen and Bolton Railway (amalgamated jointly with the East Lancashire Railway 1 January 1858)
 Liverpool, Crosby and Southport Railway (purchased 14 June 1855)
 Preston and Longridge Railway (taken over jointly with the L&NWR 17 June 1867)
 Blackburn and Preston Railway (amalgamated with the East Lancashire 3 August 1846)
 East Lancashire Railway (amalgamated as a separate division 13 August 1859, loco stocks amalgamated 17 March 1875 by adding 600 to East Lancs numbers.)
 Blackpool and Lytham Railway (amalgamated with the Preston and Wyre Joint Railway (L&Y/L&NW Joint)in 1871/2)
 West Lancashire Railway (amalgamated 15 July 1897)
 Liverpool, Southport and Preston Junction Railway (amalgamated with the West Lancashire December 1888 and with the L&Y 15 July 1897)

The Miles Platting era

William Jenkins (Indoor) 1845–1867 & William Hurst (Outdoor) 1846–1854
Although Jenkins was the Locomotive Superintendent the early years of this period saw Hawkshaw specifying the locomotives.
As Hawkshaw was not a locomotive engineer the resultant locomotives were not of the best and were hopelessly outdated long before they were withdrawn.
Hurst left to join the North British Railway in 1854 and Jenkins continued on his own.

William Yates (Indoor) 1868–1875 & William Hurst (Outdoor) 1868–1875
Following the death of Jenkins responsibility passed to Yates as Indoor Superintendent and Hurst returned as the Outdoor Superintendent. Hurst retired in 1875 and Yates resigned.
A disastrous fire at the Miles Platting works in 1873 led to the building of the new Horwich Works.

The official system of numbered classes was not introduced until 1919, therefore
classes are listed here according to the number of the first locomotive built.

The Horwich era 
Note: The class numbers below are those introduced by Hughes in 1919. Each can cover several
similar varieties, e.g. all the non-superheated 0-8-0s are Class 30

William Barton Wright (1875–1886)
During this period the Horwich Works was under construction and apart from a few
built at Miles Platting, engines came from outside manufacturers.

John Audley Frederick Aspinall (1886–1899) 
From 1889 Horwich Works was completed and from that time all engines were constructed there.

Henry Albert Hoy (1899–1904)

George Hughes (1904–1922)

Notes on L&Y classes
The "number only" classes are those introduced by George Hughes in 1919 and shown in the L&YR working timetable appendix of 1921. There is also a series of unofficial "letter and number" classes which was devised by the author R. W. Rush, and which has been copied by some other authors.

Picture gallery

Preservation 
Eight locomotives survive, these being:

References

External links 

 "A Brief History of L&YR Locomotives" from the Lancashire and Yorkshire Railway Society
 Lancashire and Yorkshire Railway Trust, owners of preserved Pugs 19 and 68, also 0-6-0 saddletank 752

Lancashire and Yorkshire Railway

Lancashire and Yorkshire Railway